Matheus de Jesus Dantas (born 5 September 1998) is a Brazilian professional footballer who plays as a centre back.

Career

Early career
Born in Mato Grosso do Sul, Dantas grew up supporting São Paulo and joined the club's youth team in 2013. In the following year, he switched to Flamengo. He broke his cruciate ligament in July 2016 and was ruled out of play for seven months. In 2017, he suffered a knee injury which also put him in the sidelines. Progressing through the youth teams, he went on to captain the under-20 team.

Flamengo

2018 season
On 17 January 2018 Dantas made his first team debut coming on as a late substitute in a 2–0 win against Volta Redonda, in Campeonato Carioca. On 2 May, his contract was extended until 31 December 2019.

2019 season
On 5 May 2019 Dantas played his first Campeonato Brasileiro Série A match at Estádio do Morumbi against São Paulo, he started the match as head coach Abel Braga fielded the whole team with reserves, the match ended 1–1.

Farense
On 21 July 2020 Farense signed Dantas from Flamengo on a free transfer. Although the transfer didn't happen as he failed in the medical exams.

Oeste
On 20 August 2020 Dantas signed on a free transfer with Oeste until December 2023.

Estrela
On 26 June 2021, he signed a two-year contract with Liga Portugal 2 club Estrela da Amadora.

Career statistics

Honours
Flamengo
Copa Libertadores: 2019
Recopa Sudamericana: 2020
Campeonato Brasileiro Série A: 2019
Supercopa do Brasil: 2020
Campeonato Carioca: 2019, 2020

References

External links

Flamengo profile

1998 births
Living people
Association football defenders
Brazilian footballers
CR Flamengo footballers
Oeste Futebol Clube players
Casa Pia A.C. players
C.F. Estrela da Amadora players
Campeonato Brasileiro Série A players
Campeonato Brasileiro Série B players
Liga Portugal 2 players
Brazilian expatriate footballers
Expatriate footballers in Portugal
Brazilian expatriate sportspeople in Portugal
People from Campo Grande
Sportspeople from Mato Grosso do Sul